Clive Smith (born 12 December 1997) is a Welsh professional footballer who plays as a right back for Atherton Collieries.

Career
Smith began his career with Preston North End, turning professional in January 2016.

In late 2016 he was on loan at non-league side Bamber Bridge, and he moved on loan to Scottish club St Johnstone in January 2017.

In May 2017 it was announced that Smith would leave Preston at the end of the season when his contract expired. He signed for Southport in December 2017.

In August 2018, he left Southport and joined Droylsden. In December 2018, he signed for Atherton Collieries. He made his debut a week later in a 2–1 win over Colwyn Bay. In June 2022, Smith joined FC United of Manchester. Smith left the club in September 2022. Following his departure, Smith returned to Atherton Collieries.

References

1997 births
Living people
Welsh footballers
Association football fullbacks
Preston North End F.C. players
Bamber Bridge F.C. players
St Johnstone F.C. players
Southport F.C. players
Droylsden F.C. players
Atherton Collieries A.F.C. players
F.C. United of Manchester players
Scottish Professional Football League players
National League (English football) players
Northern Premier League players